Hiwi may refer to the following languages:
 Guahibo language, a Guahiban language of Colombia and Venezuela
 Waia language, a Trans-Fly language of Papua New Guinea 
 Waboda language, a Trans–New-Guinea language spoken in the Fly River delta, Papua New Guinea